This is a list of all United States Supreme Court cases from volume 489 of the United States Reports:

External links

1989 in United States case law